Enzo Carli (born 13 July 1949) is an Italian sociologist, journalist, photographer and historian of photography. He was born in Senigallia.

Selected works 
Il reale immaginario, Ed. Il lavoro Editoriale, Ancona; 
E se cent'anni vi sembran pochi, Ed. Il lavoro Editoriale, Ancona; 
Fotografia, Adriatica Edizioni, Ancona 
Spazi Interiori, Adriatica Edizioni, 
Guida alla fotografia, Fabbri edizioni, Milano: 
Mario Giacomelli. La forma dentro, Charta Edizioni Ancona; 
Human Work, Provincia di Ancona, UE;
Archeologia dei sentimenti, Ideas Edizioni Benevento, 
Crisalidi, Ed. Quattro Venti, Urbino;
Quella porta sullo sguardo, Ideas Edizioni Benevento; 
Moto contrario, Ed. Alinari; 
Mi ricordo che, Ed. Alinari; 
Il dagherrotipo mutante, Ideas Edizioni Benevento.

References

1949 births
Living people
Italian photographers
Italian sociologists
20th-century Italian journalists
21st-century Italian journalists
20th-century Italian historians
21st-century Italian historians
People from Senigallia
Historians of photography